Echinoderm microtubule-associated protein-like 1 is a protein that in humans is encoded by the EML1 gene.

Human echinoderm microtubule-associated protein-like is a strong candidate for the Usher syndrome type 1A gene. Usher syndromes (USHs) are a group of genetic disorders consisting of congenital deafness, retinitis pigmentosa, and vestibular dysfunction of variable onset and severity depending on the genetic type. The disease process in USHs involves the entire brain and is not limited to the posterior fossa or auditory and visual systems. The USHs are categorized as type I (USH1A, USH1B, USH1C, USH1D, USH1E and USH1F), type II (USH2A and USH2B) and type III (USH3). The type I is the most severe form. Gene loci responsible for these three types are all mapped. Two transcript variants encoding different isoforms have been found for this gene.

References

Further reading